Incarcerating US is a 2016 documentary film produced by Life Is My Movie Entertainment. The film explores the history of the prison system in the United States and the ramifications of mass incarceration.

Synopsis
Incarcerating US  examines the current state of  U.S. prisons and the policies that lead to unprecedented over-incarceration.
Incarcerating US focuses on two major initiatives; the War on Drugs and mandatory minimum sentences.  The film presents interviews from current and former inmates, lawyers, lawmakers, and family members to argue that these initiatives failed. Notable consultants interviewed in the film include: Neill Franklin, Julie Stewart, Eric Sterling, Tim Lynch, Richard Wener and Marc Mauer.

Incarcerating Us was officially released on September 8, 2016, with the world premier in Washington D.C. followed by a panel discussion.

See also
 Mass incarceration
 Prison reform
 War on Drugs
 Drugs in the United States
 Innocence Project

References

External links
 

2016 films
2010s English-language films